Beau Ballard is a member of the Nebraska Legislature from Lincoln, Nebraska, in District 21 who was appointed by Governor Pete Ricketts in consultation with incoming Governor Jim Pillen to fill the seat of former Senator Mike Hilgers who was elected Nebraska Attorney General. Ballard was a former legislative aid in the office of Senator Hilgers for five years prior to his appointment.

Ballard is the owner and founder of two small businesses in Lincoln, BJB Strategies and the Rabbit Hole Bakery. In 2021, he was honored by the Lincoln Independent Business Association with a Young Business Leader of the Year award.

References

Republican Party Nebraska state senators
21st-century American politicians
Living people
1994 births